Mingalar Hlae is a 2015 Burmese comedy-drama film, directed by Ko Zaw (Ar Yone Oo) starring Khant Si Thu, Pyay Ti Oo, Nay Min, Soe Myat Thuzar and Moe Hay Ko. The film, produced by Khayay Phyu Film Production premiered Myanmar on February 20, 2015.

Cast
Khant Si Thu as Kyaw Than
Pyay Ti Oo as Maung Kyaing
Nay Min as Thaung Sein
Soe Myat Thuzar as Daw Soon Ma
Moe Hay Ko as Aye Thi

References

2015 films
2010s Burmese-language films
Burmese comedy-drama films
Films shot in Myanmar
2015 comedy-drama films